Plasticicumulans is a genus of bacteria from the familia of Candidatus Competibacteraceae.

References

Gammaproteobacteria
Bacteria genera